Let Loose is a British pop trio, with Richie Wermerling (born Richard John Wermerling, 11 May 1968 in Whitechapel, London) on lead vocals and keyboards, Rob Jeffrey (born Robert George Edward Jeffrey, 30 November 1967 in Romford, East London) on guitars and backing vocals, and Lee J. Murray (born 14 May 1970 in Edgware, Middlesex) on drums, percussion and backing vocals. The reformed line-up was due to tour the UK on the "Another Time, Another Place" arena tour in November 2014, but the tour was cancelled only two weeks after tickets went on sale.

History
The band initially had minor success in the UK Singles Chart with two of its first three singles, "Crazy for You" (#44) and "Seventeen" (#44). They also released "Face to Face" which was withdrawn from sale by their record label. "Crazy for You" was re-released in the UK, entering the UK Singles Chart at number 24, and climbing to finally reach number 2. The success of "Crazy for You" led to a remix of "Seventeen"; the track did not match the popularity of "Crazy for You" and peaked at number 11.

The band's first album, Let Loose, peaked at number 20 and sold 100,000 copies. The album release was followed by the single "One Night Stand" which peaked at number 12. The final track to be taken from the album was the ballad "Best in Me" which, according to the album sleeve, was recorded in the lead singer Wermerling's bedroom at the age of fifteen. The track became their second UK top 10 hit, peaking at number 8.

The band then embarked on a UK tour, and after a seven-month break, Let Loose returned with a new single "Everybody Say Everybody Do" which peaked at number 29. Another seven months passed before a new single was released – a cover version of the Bread track "Make It with You". The single reached number 7 and gave the group a third top 10 success. This was followed with "Take It Easy" which peaked at number 25.

The following album, Rollercoaster, was released and peaked at number 42 with sales of less than 30,000 copies. Two months later, a final single was released from the album in time for the Christmas market, but "Darling Be Home Soon" became the band's lowest charting single reaching number 65, and Let Loose split up shortly afterwards. Wermerling joined the band Bottlefly, Rob Jeffrey continued playing guitar in other projects and Lee Murray became a disc jockey and session drummer, and has worked in management with Holly Valance, Kelly Brook and Page 3 model Keeley Hazell.

In 1998, a Best of Let Loose album was released, but did not enter the UK Albums Chart.

In 2006, Wermerling released his first solo album, Lost. The album was released and funded by Wermerling and was available for download and as a CD through CDBaby.com and Wermerling's own website, but failed to make the chart.

In early 2008, Wermerling and Murray reunited to write and record together under the Let Loose name – Rob Jeffrey was contacted but declined to be involved in the band's come back. By December 2008, four new songs had been added to the official Let Loose Myspace page and a photoshoot had taken place. The band reported via Myspace that it was in talks with several record labels, regarding possible recording contracts. Shortly afterwards, Wermerling and Murray left, but this time Wermerling recruited four other all-new band members. The album, Paint It in Gold, was released independently in May 2009, available as a limited CD through Wermerling's own website, and the first live appearance of Let Loose with the new line-up was on 4 June 2009.

In April 2014, it was announced that the original line-up, including Jeffrey, was reforming for an arena tour called "Another Time, Another Place", scheduled to share the bill with other 1990s and 2000s acts, All Saints, Atomic Kitten, East 17, Big Brovaz and Jenny Berggren from Ace of Base. The tour was to visit eight UK cities in November 2014 but two weeks after the tickets went on sale, it was cancelled. It was unclear whether Let Loose would continue with the planned reunion.

Discography

Albums

Compilation albums

Singles

References

External links
 

Musical groups from London
British musical trios
English boy bands
English pop music groups
Musical groups established in 1993
Musical groups disestablished in 1996
Musical groups reestablished in 2008
1993 establishments in England